Frisilia neacantha is a moth in the family Lecithoceridae. It was described by Chun-Sheng Wu and Kyu-Tek Park in 1999. It is found in Sri Lanka.

The wingspan is 10–11 mm. The forewings are ochreous yellow with the termen ochreous brown and a dark brown pattern. The hindwings are light grey.

Etymology
The species name is derived from Greek acantha (meaning spine).

References

Moths described in 1999
Frisilia